Deoband School may refer to 
 Darul Uloom Deoband, an Islamic college in Deoband, India
 The Deobandi movement in Islam